Ingri d'Aulaire (December 27, 1904 – October 24, 1980) and Edgar Parin d'Aulaire (September 30, 1898 – May 1, 1986) were American writers and illustrators of children's books who worked primarily as a team, completing almost all of their well-known works together. The couple immigrated to the United States from Europe and worked on books that focused on history such as Abraham Lincoln, which won the 1940 Caldecott Medal. They were part of the group of immigrant artists composed of Feodor Rojankovsky, Roger Duvoisin, Ludwig Bemelmans, Miska Petersham and Tibor Gergely, who helped shape the Golden Age of picture books in mid-twentieth-century America.

Background
Edgar Parin, originally of Swiss citizenship, was born in Munich, Germany to an Italian portrait painter Gino Parin and Ella Auler, a talented artist and musician who had moved from St. Louis to Paris. His parents separated when Parin was six years old and he grew up spending time with each, travelling around Europe with his father. Edgar Parin took his mother's maiden name when she changed it from Auler to d'Aulaire. After studying architecture for a year in Munich, he began art studies at its School of Arts and Crafts (German:Kunstgewerbeschule). Edgar, a pupil of Hans Hofmann and Henri Matisse, studied fresco in Florence, painted murals in France and Norway, and exhibited in Paris, Berlin and Oslo. He illustrated many books in Germany from 1922 to 1926 and painted frescoes in Norway from 1926 to 1927.

Ingri Mortenson was born in Kongsberg, Norway into an artistic family. Her uncle, for instance, was a clergyman and poet who translated the Icelandic Eddas into Norwegian and set his own poetry to music by Edvard Grieg. When she was 15, the Norwegian painter Harriet Backer encouraged her to pursue art as a career, and Ingri later studied at art schools in Norway, Germany and France.

Ingri and Edgar met in Munich when Ingri was an art student. They were married in 1925. A modest insurance settlement following a near-fatal bus–trolley collision in Paris provided the seed money for Edgar's steerage-class voyage to the U.S. to scout for opportunities. He garnered enough commissions illustrating books to send for Ingri and they moved into a cold-water walk-up flat in Brooklyn in 1929.

At first they pursued separate careers. Edgar concentrated on illustrating books using wood block engravings and stone lithography; Ingri garnered commissions to paint portraits of prominent businessmen.

Their work caught the eye of the director of the New York Public Library. Acting on her suggestion, the d'Aulaires decided to turn their talents to children's books and collaborated to create The Magic Rug in 1931. Shortly thereafter they became U.S. citizens. They lived and worked in Wilton, Connecticut, from 1941 until their deaths in the 1980s. They also had a farm in Royalton, Vermont.

Literary works
Many of the d'Aulaires' early books depict the scenery and folktales of Norway: Ola, Children of the Northlights, East of the Sun and West of the Moon. Later their attention shifted to their adopted country and they produced books about American  heroes such as Pocahontas, Benjamin Franklin, and Buffalo Bill.

Using their research and travel experiences as inspiration, the husband-and-wife team produced 27 illustrated books for children including many picture books. Edgar illustrated Children of the Soil: A Story of Scandinavia by Nora Burglon, who was a 1932 Newbery Medal runner-up for that work.

The d'Aulaires won the third annual Caldecott Medal in 1940 for Abraham Lincoln, a picture-book life of the 16th U.S. President. They won the 1953 Boy's Club award for their version of Buffalo Bill (1952).

Ingri and Edgar Parin d'Aulaires' Book of Greek Myths, published by Doubleday in 1962, was an elaborately illustrated compendium of Greek mythology, 192 pages in 46 chapters.

In 1967 they published Norse Gods and Giants, based on the Prose Edda and Poetic Edda. The 154-page book presents 30 Norse myths and includes most of the basic stories of the Norse pantheon.

D'Aulaires' Trolls was one of The New York Times Book Review outstanding books of 1972. It was also a National Book Award finalist. They completed a sequel in 1976, The Terrible Troll Bird, an adaptation of one of their earlier works, Ola and Blakken.

Reprints
In 2005, New York Review Books reissued Norse Gods and Giants under the name d'Aulaires' Book of Norse Myths. This volume was carefully printed to reproduce the vibrant color and texture of the original lithographs, and includes a glowing foreword by Michael Chabon. Its immediate popularity prompted NYRB to reissue d'Aulaire's Trolls in 2006, which likewise was a meticulous reprint of the 1972 original pressing. That was followed by a reprint of The Terrible Troll Bird.

Animals Everywhere was reprinted and retitled d'Aulaires' Book of Animals in late April 2007, followed by a new edition of The Two Cars, then by Too Big and Foxie, a retelling of Anton Chekhov's short story "Kashtanka".

Translations
In 2007 and 2008 respectively, the Italian publisher, Donzelli Editori reissued smaller-format Italian language editions of Norse Myths retitled as Miti Del Nord and Trolls appearing as Il Libro Dei Troll. Several of their books are also available in Korean and Japanese language editions.

Awards
The d'Aulaires received the Catholic Library Association Regina Medal for "continued distinguished contribution to children's literature" in 1970. They were the 1974 U.S. nominee for the biennial, international Hans Christian Andersen Award for children's illustrators.

The d'Aulaires and Abraham Lincoln won the Caldecott Medal from the American Library Association in 1940, recognizing the previous year's "most distinguished American picture book for children". Buffalo Bill (1952) won the 1953 Boy's Club award. d'Aulaires' Trolls (1972) was a finalist for the annual National Book Award, Children's Literature and a New York Times Book Review "outstanding book" for 1972.

Works
 The Magic Rug, Doubleday, 1931
 Ola, Doubleday, 1932 * %%
 Ola and Blakken, Doubleday, 1933
 The Conquest of the Atlantic, Viking Press, 1933
 The Lord's Prayer, Doubleday, 1934
 Children of the Northlights, Viking Press, 1935 * %
 George Washington, Beautiful Feet Books, 1996 * ∗
 East of the Sun and West of the Moon Viking Press, 1938 * %%%
 Abraham Lincoln, Doubleday, Doran, 1939 * ∗
 Animals Everywhere, Doubleday, 1940 | * ∗
 Leif the Lucky, Doubleday, Doran, 1941 * ∗
 The Star Spangled Banner, Doubleday, Doran, 1942 
 Don’t Count Your Chicks, Doubleday, 1943
 Wings for Per, Doubleday, 1944
 Too Big, Doubleday, 1945 * 
 Pocahontas, Doubleday, 1946 * ∗
 Nils, Doubleday, 1948
 Foxie, Doubleday, 1949 * 
 Benjamin Franklin, Doubleday, 1950 * ∗
 Buffalo Bill, Doubleday, 1952 * ∗
 The Two Cars, Doubleday, 1955 * 
 Columbus, Doubleday, 1955 * ∗
 The Magic Meadow, Doubleday, 1958
 d'Aulaire's Book of Greek Myths, Doubleday, 1962 * ∗ (Also available in unabridged audio CD, narrated by Paul Newman, Sidney Poitier, Kathleen Turner, and Matthew Broderick.)∗
 Norse Gods and Giants, Doubleday, 1967 * † ∗
 Trolls, Doubleday, 1972 * # ∗
 The Terrible Troll Bird, Doubleday, 1976 * ‡ 

 * Currently in print
 | Reissued d'Aulaire's Book of Animals, New York Review Books, 2007
 # Reissued as d'Aulaires' Trolls, New York Review Books, 2006 
 † Reissued as d'Aulaires' Book of Norse Myths, New York Review Books, 2005
 ‡ Based on the earlier Ola and Blakken
% Reissued by the University of Minnesota Press, 2012
%% Reissued by the University of Minnesota Press, 2013
%%% Reissued by the University of Minnesota Press, 2016

See also

References

External links
 
 
 
 
 Edgar Parin and Ingri D'Aulaire Papers. General Collection, Beinecke Rare Book and Manuscript Library, Yale University.
 "The d'Aulaires' Children's Books" at Facebook

American children's writers
American children's book illustrators
Caldecott Medal winners
Married couples
People from Kongsberg
People from Wilton, Connecticut
Writers from Connecticut
Writers who illustrated their own writing
Writing duos